Salwad is a Census Town situated at Palghar district. The town is located approximately 20 kilometers away from Palghar district and 155 kilometers away from Thane. The town is a home to an estimated 10,000 people.

Demographics
The town is a home to 10 thousand people, amongst them 6237 (approx 60 percent) are male and 4160 (approx 40 percent) are female. The Hindus form 91 percent of the total population, followed by the Muslims who form 6 percent of the total population. Male literacy is at 92.47 percent whereas female literacy rate is 80.86 percent as per 2011 Indian Census.

References

Cities and towns in Palghar district
Census towns in Maharashtra